Flerovium is a superheavy chemical element with symbol Fl and atomic number 114. It is an extremely radioactive synthetic element. It is named after the Flerov Laboratory of Nuclear Reactions of the Joint Institute for Nuclear Research in Dubna, Russia, where the element was discovered in 1999. The lab's name, in turn, honours Russian physicist Georgy Flyorov ( in Cyrillic, hence the transliteration of "yo" to "e"). IUPAC adopted the name on 30 May 2012. The name and symbol had previously been proposed for element 102 (nobelium), but was not accepted by IUPAC at that time.

It is a transactinide in the p-block of the periodic table. It is in period 7; the heaviest known member of the carbon group, and the last element whose chemistry has been investigated. Initial chemical studies in 2007–2008 indicated that flerovium was unexpectedly volatile for a group 14 element; in preliminary results it even seemed to exhibit properties similar to noble gases. More recent results show that flerovium's reaction with gold is similar to that of copernicium, showing it is very volatile and may even be gaseous at standard temperature and pressure, that it would show metallic properties, consistent with being the heavier homologue of lead, and that it would be the least reactive metal in group 14. Whether flerovium behaves more like a metal or a noble gas is still unresolved as of 2022; it might also be a semiconductor.

About 90 flerovium atoms have been seen: 58 were synthesized directly; the rest have been populated from radioactive decay of heavier elements. All these flerovium atoms have been shown to have mass number 284–290. The stablest known isotope, 289Fl, has a half-life of ~1.9 seconds, but the unconfirmed 290Fl may have a longer half-life of 19 seconds; this would be one of the longest half-lives of any nuclide in these farthest reaches of the periodic table. Flerovium is predicted to be near the centre of the theorized island of stability, and it is expected that heavier flerovium isotopes, especially the possibly magic 298Fl, may have even longer half-lives.

Introduction

History

Pre-discovery
In the late 1940s to early 1960s, the early days of making heavier and heavier transuranic elements, it was predicted that since such elements did not occur naturally, they would have shorter and shorter spontaneous fission half-lives, until they stopped existing altogether around element 108 (now called hassium). Initial work in synthesizing the heavier actinides seemed to confirm this. But the nuclear shell model, introduced in 1949 and extensively developed in the late 1960s by William Myers and Władysław Świątecki, stated that protons and neutrons form shells within a nucleus, analogous to electron shells. Noble gases are unreactive due to a full electron shell; similarly, it was theorized that elements with full nuclear shells – those having "magic" numbers of protons or neutrons – would be stabilized against decay. A doubly magic isotope, with magic numbers of both protons and neutrons, would be especially stabilized. Heiner Meldner calculated in 1965 that the next doubly magic isotope after 208Pb was 298Fl with 114 protons and 184 neutrons, which would be the centre of an "island of stability". This island of stability, supposedly from copernicium (Z = 112) to oganesson (Z = 118), would come after a long "sea of instability" from mendelevium (Z = 101) to roentgenium (Z = 111), and the flerovium isotopes in it were speculated in 1966 to have half-lives over 108 years. These early predictions fascinated researchers, and led to the first attempt to make flerovium, in 1968 with the reaction 248Cm(40Ar,xn). No flerovium atoms were detected; this was thought to be because the compound nucleus 288Fl only has 174 neutrons instead of the supposed magic 184, and this would have significant impact on the reaction cross section (yield) and half-lives of nuclei produced. It was then 30 more years before flerovium was first made. Later work suggests the islands of stability around hassium and flerovium occur because these nuclei are respectively deformed and oblate, which make them resistant to spontaneous fission, and that the true island of stability for spherical nuclei occurs at around unbibium-306 (122 protons, 184 neutrons).

First signs
The first sign of flerovium was found in December 1998 by a team of scientists at Joint Institute for Nuclear Research (JINR), Dubna, Russia, led by Yuri Oganessian, who bombarded a target of plutonium-244 with accelerated nuclei of calcium-48:

 +  → * →  + 2 

This reaction had been tried before, without success; for this 1998 attempt, JINR had upgraded all of its equipment to detect and separate the produced atoms better and bombard the target more intensely. One atom of flerovium, alpha decaying with lifetime 30.4 s, was detected. The decay energy measured was 9.71 MeV, giving an expected half-life of 2–23 s. This observation was assigned to 289Fl and was published in January 1999. The experiment was later repeated, but an isotope with these decay properties was never observed again, so the exact identity of this activity is unknown. It may have been due to the isomer 289mFl, but because the presence of a whole series of longer-lived isomers in its decay chain would be rather doubtful, the most likely assignment of this chain is to the 2n channel leading to 290Fl and electron capture to 290Nh, which fits well with the systematics and trends of flerovium isotopes, and is consistent with the low beam energy chosen for that experiment, though further confirmation would be desirable via synthesis of 294Lv in a 248Cm(48Ca,2n) reaction, which would alpha decay to 290Fl. The RIKEN team reported possible synthesis of isotopes 294Lv and 290Fl in 2016 in a 248Cm(48Ca,2n) reaction, but the alpha decay of 294Lv was missed, alpha decay of 290Fl to 286Cn was observed instead of electron capture to 290Nh, and the assignment to 294Lv instead of 293Lv and decay to an isomer of 285Cn was not certain.

Glenn T. Seaborg, a scientist at Lawrence Berkeley National Laboratory who had been involved in work to make such superheavy elements, had said in December 1997 that "one of his longest-lasting and most cherished dreams was to see one of these magic elements"; he was told of the synthesis of flerovium by his colleague Albert Ghiorso soon after its publication in 1999. Ghiorso later recalled:

Seaborg died two months later, on 25 February 1999.

In March 1999, the same team replaced the 244Pu target with 242Pu, to make other flerovium isotopes. Here, two atoms of flerovium were produced, alpha-decaying with half-life 5.5 s. They were assigned as 287Fl. This activity has not been seen again either, and it is unclear what nucleus was produced. It is possible that it was the isomer 287mFl or from electron capture by 287Fl, leading to 287Nh and 283Rg.

Confirmed discovery
The now-confirmed discovery of flerovium was made in June 1999 when the Dubna team repeated the first reaction from 1998. This time, two atoms of flerovium were produced; they alpha decayed with half-life 2.6 s, different from the 1998 result. This activity was initially assigned to 288Fl in error, due to the confusion regarding the previous observations that were assumed to come from 289Fl. Further work in December 2002 finally allowed a positive reassignment of the June 1999 atoms to 289Fl.

In May 2009, the Joint Working Party (JWP) of IUPAC published a report on the discovery of copernicium in which they acknowledged discovery of the isotope 283Cn. This implied the discovery of flerovium, from the acknowledgement of the data for the synthesis of 287Fl and 291Lv, which decay to 283Cn. The discovery of flerovium-286 and -287 was confirmed in January 2009 at Berkeley. This was followed by confirmation of flerovium-288 and -289 in July 2009 at Gesellschaft für Schwerionenforschung (GSI) in Germany. In 2011, IUPAC evaluated the Dubna team's 1999–2007 experiments. They found the early data inconclusive, but accepted the results of 2004–2007 as flerovium, and the element was officially recognized as having been discovered.

Isotopes

While the method of chemical characterization of a daughter was successful for flerovium and livermorium, and the simpler structure of even–even nuclei made confirmation of oganesson (Z = 118) straightforward, there have been difficulties in establishing the congruence of decay chains from isotopes with odd protons, odd neutrons, or both. To get around this problem with hot fusion, the decay chains from which terminate in spontaneous fission instead of connecting to known nuclei as cold fusion allows, experiments were done in Dubna in 2015 to produce lighter isotopes of flerovium by reaction of 48Ca with 239Pu and 240Pu, particularly 283Fl, 284Fl, and 285Fl; the last had previously been characterized in the 242Pu(48Ca,5n)285Fl reaction at Lawrence Berkeley National Laboratory in 2010. 285Fl was more clearly characterized, while the new isotope 284Fl was found to undergo immediate spontaneous fission instead of alpha decay to known nuclides around the N = 162 shell closure, and 283Fl was not found. This lightest isotope may yet conceivably be produced in the cold fusion reaction 208Pb(76Ge,n)283Fl, which the team at RIKEN in Japan has considered investigating: this reaction is expected to have a higher cross-section of 200 fb than the "world record" low of 30 fb for 209Bi(70Zn,n)278Nh, the reaction which RIKEN used for the official discovery of element 113 (nihonium). The Dubna team repeated their investigation of the 240Pu+48Ca reaction in 2017, observing three new consistent decay chains of 285Fl, another decay chain from this nuclide that may pass through some isomeric states in its daughters, a chain that could be assigned to 287Fl (likely from 242Pu impurities in the target), and some spontaneous fissions of which some could be from 284Fl, though other interpretations including side reactions involving evaporation of charged particles are also possible.

Naming

Per Mendeleev's nomenclature for unnamed and undiscovered elements, flerovium is sometimes called eka-lead. In 1979, IUPAC published recommendations according to which the element was to be called ununquadium (symbol Uuq), a systematic element name as a placeholder, until the discovery of the element is confirmed and a permanent name is decided on. Most scientists in the field called it "element 114", with the symbol of E114, (114) or 114.

Per IUPAC recommendations, the discoverer(s) of a new element has the right to suggest a name.
After IUPAC recognized the discovery of flerovium and livermorium on 1 June 2011, IUPAC asked the discovery team at JINR to suggest permanent names for the two elements. The Dubna team chose the name flerovium (symbol Fl), after Russia's Flerov Laboratory of Nuclear Reactions (FLNR), named after Soviet physicist Georgy Flyorov (also spelled Flerov); earlier reports claim the element name was directly proposed to honour Flyorov. In accordance with the proposal received from the discoverers, IUPAC officially named flerovium after Flerov Laboratory of Nuclear Reactions, not after Flyorov himself. Flyorov is known for writing to Joseph Stalin in April 1942 and pointing out the silence in scientific journals in the field of nuclear fission in the United States, Great Britain, and Germany. Flyorov deduced that this research must have become classified information in those countries. Flyorov's work and urgings led to the development of the USSR's own atomic bomb project. Flyorov is also known for the discovery of spontaneous fission with Konstantin Petrzhak. The naming ceremony for flerovium and livermorium was held on 24 October 2012 in Moscow.

In a 2015 interview with Oganessian, the host, in preparation to ask a question, said, "You said you had dreamed to name [an element] after your teacher Georgy Flyorov." Without letting the host finish, Oganessian repeatedly said, "I did."

Predicted properties
Very few properties of flerovium or its compounds have been measured; due to its extremely limited and expensive production and the fact that it decays very quickly. A few singular properties have been measured, but for the most part, properties of flerovium remain unknown and only predictions are available.

Nuclear stability and isotopes

The basis of the chemical periodicity in the periodic table is the electron shell closure at each noble gas (atomic numbers 2, 10, 18, 36, 54, 86, and 118): as any further electrons must enter a new shell with higher energy, closed-shell electron configurations are markedly more stable, hence the inertness of noble gases. Protons and neutrons are also known to form closed nuclear shells, so the same happens at nucleon shell closures, which happen at specific nucleon numbers often dubbed "magic numbers". The known magic numbers are 2, 8, 20, 28, 50, and 82 for protons and neutrons; also 126 for neutrons. Nuclei with magic proton and neutron numbers, such as helium-4, oxygen-16, calcium-48, and lead-208, are "doubly magic" and are very stable. This stability is very important for superheavy elements: with no stabilization, half-lives would be expected by exponential extrapolation to be nanoseconds at darmstadtium (element 110), because the ever-increasing electrostatic repulsion between protons overcomes the limited-range strong nuclear force that holds nuclei together. The next closed nucleon shells (magic numbers) are thought to denote the centre of the long-sought island of stability, where half-lives to alpha decay and spontaneous fission lengthen again.

Initially, by analogy with neutron magic number 126, the next proton shell was also expected at element 126, too far beyond the synthesis capabilities of the mid-20th century to get much theoretical attention. In 1966, new values for the potential and spin–orbit interaction in this region of the periodic table contradicted this and predicted that the next proton shell would instead be at element 114, and that nuclei in this region would be relatively stable against spontaneous fission. The expected closed neutron shells in this region were at neutron number 184 or 196, making 298Fl and 310Fl candidates for being doubly magic. 1972 estimates predicted a half-life of around 1 year for 298Fl, which was expected to be near an island of stability centered near 294Ds (with a half-life around 1010 years, comparable to 232Th). After making the first isotopes of elements 112–118 at the turn of the 21st century, it was found that these neutron-deficient isotopes were stabilized against fission. In 2008 it was thus hypothesized that the stabilization against fission of these nuclides was due to their oblate nuclei, and that a region of oblate nuclei was centred on 288Fl. Also, new theoretical models showed that the expected energy gap between the proton orbitals 2f7/2 (filled at element 114) and 2f5/2 (filled at element 120) was smaller than expected, so element 114 no longer appeared to be a stable spherical closed nuclear shell. The next doubly magic nucleus is now expected to be around 306Ubb, but this nuclide's expected short half-life and low production cross section make its synthesis challenging. Still, the island of stability is expected to exist in this region, and nearer its centre (which has not been approached closely enough yet) some nuclides, such as 291Mc and its alpha- and beta-decay daughters, may be found to decay by positron emission or electron capture and thus move into the centre of the island. Due to the expected high fission barriers, any nucleus in this island of stability would decay exclusively by alpha decay and perhaps some electron capture and beta decay, both of which would bring the nuclei closer to the beta-stability line where the island is expected to be. Electron capture is needed to reach the island, which is problematic because it is not certain that electron capture is a major decay mode in this region of the chart of nuclides.

Experiments were done in 2000–2004 at Flerov Laboratory of Nuclear Reactions in Dubna studying the fission properties of the compound nucleus 292Fl by bombarding 244Pu with accelerated 48Ca ions. A compound nucleus is a loose combination of nucleons that have not yet arranged themselves into nuclear shells. It has no internal structure and is held together only by the collision forces between the two nuclei. Results showed how such nuclei fission mainly by expelling doubly magic or nearly doubly magic fragments such as 40Ca, 132Sn, 208Pb, or 209Bi. It was also found that 48Ca and 58Fe projectiles had a similar yield for the fusion-fission pathway, hence possible future use of 58Fe projectiles in making superheavy elements. It has also been suggested that a neutron-rich flerovium isotope can be formed by quasifission (partial fusion followed by fission) of a massive nucleus. Recently it has been shown that multi-nucleon transfer reactions in collisions of actinide nuclei (such as uranium and curium) might be used to make neutron-rich superheavy nuclei in the island of stability, though production of neutron-rich nobelium or seaborgium is more likely.

Theoretical estimates of alpha decay half-lives of flerovium isotopes, support the experimental data.
The fission-survived isotope 298Fl, long expected to be doubly magic, is predicted to have alpha decay half-life ~17 days. Making 298Fl directly by a fusion–evaporation pathway is currently impossible: no known combination of target and stable projectile can give 184 neutrons for the compound nucleus, and radioactive projectiles such as 50Ca (half-life 14 s) cannot yet be used in the needed quantity and intensity. One possibility for making the theorized long-lived nuclei of copernicium (291Cn and 293Cn) and flerovium near the middle of the island, is using even heavier targets such as 250Cm, 249Bk, 251Cf, and 254Es, that when fused with 48Ca would yield isotopes such as 291Mc and 291Fl (as decay products of 299Uue, 295Ts, and 295Lv), which may have just enough neutrons to alpha decay to nuclides close enough to the centre of the island to possibly undergo electron capture and move inward to the centre. However, reaction cross sections would be small and little is yet known about the decay properties of superheavies near the beta-stability line. This may be the current best hope to synthesize nuclei in the island of stability, but it is speculative and may or may not work in practice. Another possibility is to use controlled nuclear explosions to get the high neutron flux needed to make macroscopic amounts of such isotopes. This would mimic the r-process where the actinides were first produced in nature and the gap of instability after polonium bypassed, as it would bypass the gaps of instability at 258–260Fm and at mass number 275 (atomic numbers 104 to 108). Some such isotopes (especially 291Cn and 293Cn) may even have been synthesized in nature, but would decay far too quickly (with half-lives of only thousands of years) and be produced in far too small quantities (~10−12 the abundance of lead) to be detectable today outside cosmic rays.

Atomic and physical
Flerovium is in group 14 in the periodic table, below carbon, silicon, germanium, tin, and lead. Every previous group 14 element has 4 electrons in its valence shell, hence valence electron configuration ns2np2. For flerovium, the trend will continue and the valence electron configuration is predicted as 7s27p2; flerovium will be similar to its lighter congeners in many ways. Differences are likely to arise; a large contributor is spin–orbit (SO) interaction—mutual interaction between the electrons' motion and spin. It is especially strong in superheavy elements, because the electrons move faster than in lighter atoms, at speeds comparable to the speed of light. For flerovium, it lowers the 7s and the 7p electron energy levels (stabilizing the corresponding electrons), but two of the 7p electron energy levels are stabilized more than the other four. The stabilization of the 7s electrons is called the inert pair effect, and the effect "tearing" the 7p subshell into the more and less stabilized parts is called subshell splitting. For many theoretical purposes, the valence electron configuration may be represented to reflect the 7p subshell split as 7s7p. These effects cause flerovium's chemistry to be somewhat different from that of its lighter neighbours.

Because the spin–orbit splitting of the 7p subshell is very large in flerovium, and both of flerovium's filled orbitals in the 7th shell are stabilized relativistically; the valence electron configuration of flerovium may be considered to have a completely filled shell. Its first ionization energy of  should be the second-highest in group 14. The 6d electron levels are also destabilized, leading to some early speculations that they may be chemically active, though newer work suggests this is unlikely. Because the first ionization energy is higher than in silicon and germanium, though still lower than in carbon, it has been suggested that flerovium could be classed as a metalloid.

Flerovium's closed-shell electron configuration means metallic bonding in metallic flerovium is weaker than in the elements before and after; so flerovium is expected to have a low boiling point, and has recently been suggested to be possibly a gaseous metal, similar to predictions for copernicium, which also has a closed-shell electron configuration. Flerovium's melting and boiling points were predicted in the 1970s to be around 70 and 150 °C, significantly lower than for the lighter group 14 elements (lead has 327 and 1749 °C), and continuing the trend of decreasing boiling points down the group. Earlier studies predicted a boiling point of ~1000 °C or 2840 °C, but this is now considered unlikely because of the expected weak metallic bonding and that group trends would expect flerovium to have low sublimation enthalpy. Preliminary 2021 calculations predicted that flerovium should have melting point −73 °C (lower than mercury at −39 °C and copernicium, predicted 10±11 °C) and boiling point 107 °C, which would make it a liquid metal. Like mercury, radon, and copernicium, but not lead and oganesson (eka-radon), flerovium is calculated to have no electron affinity.

A 2010 study published calculations predicting a hexagonal close-packed crystal structure for flerovium due to spin–orbit coupling effects, and a density of 9.928 g/cm3, though this was noted to be probably slightly too low. Newer calculations published in 2017 expected flerovium to crystallize in face-centred cubic crystal structure like its lighter congener lead, and calculations published in 2022 predicted a density of 11.4±0.3 g/cm3, similar to lead (11.34 g/cm3). These calculations found that the face-centred cubic and hexagonal close-packed structures should have nearly the same energy, a phenomenon reminiscent of the noble gases. These calculations predict that hexagonal close-packed flerovium should be a semiconductor, with a band gap of 0.8±0.3 eV. (Copernicium is also predicted to be a semiconductor.) These calculations predict that the cohesive energy of flerovium should be around −0.5±0.1 eV; this is similar to that predicted for oganesson (−0.45 eV), larger than that predicted for copernicium (−0.38 eV), but smaller than that of mercury (−0.79 eV). The melting point was calculated as 284±50 K (11±50 °C), so that flerovium is probably a liquid at room temperature, although the boiling point was not determined.

The electron of a hydrogen-like flerovium ion (Fl113+; remove all but one electron) is expected to move so fast that its mass is 1.79 times that of a stationary electron, due to relativistic effects. (The figures for hydrogen-like lead and tin are expected to be 1.25 and 1.073 respectively.) Flerovium would form weaker metal–metal bonds than lead and would be adsorbed less on surfaces.

Chemical
Flerovium is the heaviest known member of group 14, below lead, and is projected to be the second member of the 7p series of elements. Nihonium and flerovium are expected to form a very short subperiod corresponding to the filling of the 7p1/2 orbital, coming between the filling of the 6d5/2 and 7p3/2 subshells. Their chemical behaviour is expected to be very distinctive: nihonium's homology to thallium has been called "doubtful" by computational chemists, while flerovium's to lead has been called only "formal".

The first five group 14 members show a +4 oxidation state and the latter members have increasingly prominent +2 chemistry due to onset of the inert pair effect. For tin, the +2 and +4 states are similar in stability, and lead(II) is the most stable of all the chemically well-understood +2 oxidation states in group 14. The 7s orbitals are very highly stabilized in flerovium, so a very large sp3 orbital hybridization is needed to achieve a +4 oxidation state, so flerovium is expected to be even more stable than lead in its strongly predominant +2 oxidation state and its +4 oxidation state should be highly unstable. For example, the dioxide (FlO2) is expected to be highly unstable to decomposition into its constituent elements (and would not be formed by direct reaction of flerovium with oxygen), and flerovane (FlH4), which should have Fl–H bond lengths of 1.787 Å, is predicted to be more thermodynamically unstable than plumbane, spontaneously decomposing to flerovium(II) hydride (FlH2) and H2. The tetrafluoride FlF4 would have bonding mostly due to sd hybridizations rather than sp3 hybridizations, and its decomposition to the difluoride and fluorine gas would be exothermic. The other tetrahalides (for example, FlCl4 is destabilized by about 400 kJ/mol) decompose similarly. The sd hybridizations were suggested in early calculations, as flerovium's 7s and 6d electrons share about the same energy, which would allow a volatile hexafluoride to form, but later calculations do not confirm this possibility. In general, spin–orbit contraction of the 7p1/2 orbital should lead to smaller bond lengths and larger bond angles: this has been theoretically confirmed in FlH2. Still, even FlH2 should be relativistically destabilized by 2.6 eV to below Fl+H2; the large spin–orbit effects also break down the usual singlet–triplet divide in the group 14 dihydrides. FlF2 and FlCl2 are predicted to be more stable than FlH2.

Due to relativistic stabilization of flerovium's 7s27p valence electron configuration, the 0 oxidation state should also be more stable for flerovium than for lead, as the 7p1/2 electrons begin to also have a mild inert pair effect: this stabilization of the neutral state may bring about some similarities between the behavior of flerovium and the noble gas radon. Due to flerovium's expected relative inertness, diatomic compounds FlH and FlF should have lower energies of dissociation than the corresponding lead compounds PbH and PbF. Flerovium(IV) should be even more electronegative than lead(IV); lead(IV) has electronegativity 2.33 on the Pauling scale, though the lead(II) value is only 1.87. Flerovium could be a noble metal.

The fluorides would undergo strong hydrolysis in aqueous solution. All flerovium dihalides are expected to be stable; the difluoride being water-soluble. Spin–orbit effects would destabilize the dihydride (FlH2) by almost . In aqueous solution, the oxyanion flerovite would also form, analogous to plumbite. Flerovium(II) sulfate (FlSO4) and sulfide (FlS) should be very insoluble in water, and flerovium(II) acetate (FlC2H3O2) and nitrate (Fl(NO3)2) should be quite water-soluble. The standard electrode potential for reduction of Fl2+ ion to metallic flerovium is estimated to be around +0.9 V, confirming the increased stability of flerovium in the neutral state. In general, due to relativistic stabilization of the 7p1/2 spinor, Fl2+ is expected to have properties intermediate between those of Hg2+ or Cd2+ and its lighter congener Pb2+.

Experimental chemistry
Flerovium is currently the last element whose chemistry has been experimentally investigated, though studies so far are not conclusive. Two experiments were done in April–May 2007 in a joint FLNR-PSI collaboration to study copernicium chemistry. The first experiment used the reaction 242Pu(48Ca,3n)287Fl; and the second, 244Pu(48Ca,4n)288Fl: these reactions give short-lived flerovium isotopes whose copernicium daughters would then be studied. Adsorption properties of the resultant atoms on a gold surface were compared to those of radon, as it was then expected that copernicium's full-shell electron configuration would lead to noble-gas like behavior. Noble gases interact with metal surfaces very weakly, which is uncharacteristic of metals.

The first experiment found 3 atoms of 283Cn but seemingly also 1 atom of 287Fl. This was a surprise; transport time for the product atoms is ~2 s, so the flerovium should have decayed to copernicium before adsorption. In the second reaction, 2 atoms of 288Fl and possibly 1 of 289Fl were seen. Two of the three atoms showed adsorption characteristics associated with a volatile, noble-gas-like element, which has been suggested but is not predicted by more recent calculations. These experiments gave independent confirmation for the discovery of copernicium, flerovium, and livermorium via comparison with published decay data. Further experiments in 2008 to confirm this important result detected 1 atom of 289Fl, and supported previous data showing flerovium had a noble-gas-like interaction with gold.

Empirical support for a noble-gas-like flerovium soon weakened. In 2009 and 2010, the FLNR-PSI collaboration synthesized more flerovium to follow up their 2007 and 2008 studies. In particular, the first three flerovium atoms made in the 2010 study suggested again a noble-gas-like character, but the complete set taken together resulted in a more ambiguous interpretation, unusual for a metal in the carbon group but not fully like a noble gas in character. In their paper, the scientists refrained from calling flerovium's chemical properties "close to those of noble gases", as had previously been done in the 2008 study. Flerovium's volatility was again measured through interactions with a gold surface, and provided indications that the volatility of flerovium was comparable to that of mercury, astatine, and the simultaneously investigated copernicium, which had been shown in the study to be a very volatile noble metal, conforming to its being the heaviest known group 12 element. Still, it was pointed out that this volatile behavior was not expected for a usual group 14 metal.

In experiments in 2012 at GSI, flerovium's chemistry was found to be more metallic than noble-gas-like. Jens Volker Kratz and Christoph Düllmann specifically named copernicium and flerovium as being in a new category of "volatile metals"; Kratz even speculated that they might be gases at standard temperature and pressure. These "volatile metals", as a category, were expected to fall between normal metals and noble gases in terms of adsorption properties. Contrary to the 2009 and 2010 results, it was shown in the 2012 experiments that the interactions of flerovium and copernicium respectively with gold were about equal. Further studies showed that flerovium was more reactive than copernicium, in contradiction to previous experiments and predictions.

In a 2014 paper detailing the experimental results of the chemical characterization of flerovium, the GSI group wrote: "[flerovium] is the least reactive element in the group, but still a metal." Nevertheless, in a 2016 conference about chemistry and physics of heavy and superheavy elements, Alexander Yakushev and Robert Eichler, two scientists who had been active at GSI and FLNR in determining flerovium's chemistry, still urged caution based on the inconsistencies of the various experiments previously listed, noting that the question of whether flerovium was a metal or a noble gas was still open with the known evidence: one study suggested a weak noble-gas-like interaction between flerovium and gold, while the other suggested a stronger metallic interaction. The longer-lived isotope 289Fl has been considered of interest for future radiochemical studies.

New experiments published in 2022 suggest that flerovium is a metal, exhibiting lower reactivity towards gold than mercury, but higher reactivity than radon. The experiments could not identify if the adsorption was due to elemental flerovium (considered more likely), or if it was due to a flerovium compound such as FlO that was more reactive towards gold than elemental flerovium, but both scenarios involve flerovium forming chemical bonds.

See also
 Island of stability: Flerovium–Unbinilium–Unbihexium
 Isotopes of flerovium
 Extended periodic table

Notes

References

Bibliography 

 pp. 030001-1–030001-17, pp. 030001-18–030001-138, Table I. The NUBASE2016 table of nuclear and decay properties

External links

 CERN Courier – First postcard from the island of nuclear stability
 CERN Courier – Second postcard from the island of stability

 
Chemical elements
Synthetic elements